Hypoxia refers to low oxygen conditions. Normally, 20.9% of the gas in the atmosphere is oxygen. The partial pressure of oxygen in the atmosphere is 20.9% of the total barometric pressure. In water, oxygen levels are much lower, approximately 7 ppm or 0.0007% in good quality water, and fluctuate locally depending on the presence of photosynthetic organisms and relative distance to the surface (if there is more oxygen in the air, it will diffuse across the partial pressure gradient).

Atmospheric hypoxia
Atmospheric hypoxia occurs naturally at high altitudes. Total atmospheric pressure decreases as altitude increases, causing a lower partial pressure of oxygen, which is defined as hypobaric hypoxia. Oxygen remains at 20.9% of the total gas mixture, differing from hypoxic hypoxia, where the percentage of oxygen in the air (or blood) is decreased. This is common in the sealed burrows of some subterranean animals, such as blesmols. Atmospheric hypoxia is also the basis of altitude training, which is a standard part of training for elite athletes. Several companies mimic hypoxia using normobaric artificial atmosphere.

Aquatic hypoxia

Oxygen depletion is a phenomenon that occurs in aquatic environments as dissolved oxygen (DO; molecular oxygen dissolved in the water) becomes reduced in concentration to a point where it becomes detrimental to aquatic organisms living in the system. Dissolved oxygen is typically expressed as a percentage of the oxygen that would dissolve in the water at the prevailing temperature and salinity (both of which affect the solubility of oxygen in water; see oxygen saturation and underwater). An aquatic system lacking dissolved oxygen (0% saturation) is termed anaerobic, reducing, or anoxic; a system with low concentration—in the range between 1 and 30% saturation—is called hypoxic or dysoxic. Most fish cannot live below 30% saturation since they rely on oxygen to derive energy from their nutrients. Hypoxia leads to impaired reproduction of remaining fish via endocrine disruption. A "healthy" aquatic environment should seldom experience less than 80% saturation. The exaerobic zone is found at the boundary of anoxic and hypoxic zones.

Hypoxia can occur throughout the water column and also at high altitudes as well as near sediments on the bottom. It usually extends throughout 20-50% of the water column, but depends on the water depth and location of pycnoclines (rapid changes in water density with depth). It can occur in 10-80% of the water column. For example, in a 10-meter water column, it can reach up to 2 meters below the surface. In a 20-meter water column, it can extend up to 8 meters below the surface.

Seasonal kill 
Hypolimnetic oxygen depletion can lead to both summer and winter "kills". During summer stratification, inputs or organic matter and sedimentation of primary producers can increase rates of respiration in the hypolimnion. If oxygen depletion becomes extreme, aerobic organisms, like fish, may die, resulting in what is known as a "summer kill". The same phenomena can occur in the winter, but for different reasons. During winter, ice and snow cover can attenuate light, and therefore reduce rates of photosynthesis. The freezing over of a lake also prevents air-water interactions that allow the exchange of oxygen. This creates a lack of oxygen while respiration continues. When the oxygen becomes badly depleted, anaerobic organisms can die, resulting in a "winter kill".

Causes of hypoxia

Oxygen depletion can result from a number of natural factors, but is most often a concern as a consequence of pollution and eutrophication in which plant nutrients enter a river, lake, or ocean, and phytoplankton blooms are encouraged. While phytoplankton, through photosynthesis, will raise DO saturation during daylight hours, the dense population of a bloom reduces DO saturation during the night by respiration. When phytoplankton cells die, they sink towards the bottom and are decomposed by bacteria, a process that further reduces DO in the water column. If oxygen depletion progresses to hypoxia, fish kills can occur and invertebrates like worms and clams on the bottom may be killed as well.

Hypoxia may also occur in the absence of pollutants. In estuaries, for example, because freshwater flowing from a river into the sea is less dense than salt water, stratification in the water column can result. Vertical mixing between the water bodies is therefore reduced, restricting the supply of oxygen from the surface waters to the more saline bottom waters. The oxygen concentration in the bottom layer may then become low enough for hypoxia to occur. Areas particularly prone to this include shallow waters of semi-enclosed water bodies such as the Waddenzee or the Gulf of Mexico, where land run-off is substantial. In these areas a so-called "dead zone" can be created. Low dissolved oxygen conditions are often seasonal, as is the case in Hood Canal and areas of Puget Sound, in Washington State. The World Resources Institute has identified 375 hypoxic coastal zones around the world, concentrated in coastal areas in Western Europe, the Eastern and Southern coasts of the US, and East Asia, particularly in Japan.

 Hypoxia may also be the explanation for periodic phenomena such as the Mobile Bay jubilee, where aquatic life suddenly rushes to the shallows, perhaps trying to escape oxygen-depleted water. Recent widespread shellfish kills near the coasts of Oregon and Washington are also blamed on cyclic dead zone ecology.

Phytoplankton breakdown 
Scientists have determined that high concentrations of minerals dumped into bodies of water causes significant growth of phytoplankton blooms. As these blooms are broken down by bacteria and other taxa, such as Phanerochaete chrysosporium, oxygen is depleted by the enzymes of these organisms.

Breakdown of lignin 

Phytoplankton are mostly made up of lignin and cellulose, which are broken down by enzymes present in organisms such as P. chrysosporium, known as white-rot. The breakdown of cellulose does not deplete oxygen concentration in water, but the breakdown of lignin does. This breakdown of lignin includes an oxidative mechanism, and requires the presence of dissolved oxygen to take place by enzymes like ligninperoxidase. Other fungi such as brown-rot, soft-rot, and blue stain fungi also are necessary in lignin transformation. As this oxidation takes place, CO2 is formed in its place.

Ligninperoxidase (LiP) serves as the most import enzyme because it is best at breaking down lignin in these organisms. LiP disrupts C-C bonds and C-O bonds within lignin's three-dimensional structure, causing it to break down. LiP consists of ten alpha helices, two Ca2+ structural ions, as well as a heme group called a tetrapyrrol ring. Oxygen serves an important role in the catalytic cycle of LiP to form a double bond on the Fe2+ ion in the tetrapyrrol ring. Without the presence of diatomic oxygen in the water, this breakdown cannot take place because Ferrin-LiP will not be reduced into oxyferroheme. Oxygen gas is used to reduce Ferrin-LiP into oxyferroheme-LiP. Oxyferroheme and veratric alcohol combine to create oxygen radical and Ferri-LiP, which can now be used to degrade lignin. Oxygen radicals cannot be used in the environment, and are harmful in high presence in the environment.

Once Ferri-LiP is present in the ligninperoxidase, it can be used to break down lignin molecules by removing one phenylpropane group at a time through either the LRET mechanism or the mediator mechanism. The LRET mechanism (long range electron transfer mechanism) transfers an electron from the tetrapyrrol ring onto a molecule of phenylpropane in a lignin. This electron moves onto a C-C or C-O bond to break one phenylpropane molecule from the lignin, breaking it down by removing one phenylpropane at a time.

In the mediator mechanism, LiP enzyme is activated by the addition of hydrogen peroxide to make LiP radical, and a mediator such as veratric alcohol is added and activated creating veratric alcohol radical. Veratric alcohol radical transfers one electron to activate the phenylpropane on lignin, and the electron dismantles a C-C or C-O bond to release one phenylpropane from the lignin. As the size of a lignin molecule increases, the more difficult it is to break these C-C or C-O bonds. Three types of phenyl propane rings include coniferyl alcohol, sinapyl alcohol, and-coumaryl alcohol.

LiP has a very low MolDock score, meaning there is little energy required to form this enzyme and stabilize it to carry out reactions. LiP has a MolDock score of -156.03 kcal/mol. This is energetically favorable due to its negative free energy requirements, and therefore this reaction catalyzed by LiP is likely to take place spontaneously. Breakdown of propanol and phenols occur naturally in the environment because they are both water-soluble.

Environmental factors 

The breakdown of phytoplankton in the environment depends on the presence of oxygen, and once oxygen is no longer in the bodies of water, ligninperoxidases cannot continue to break down the lignin. When oxygen is not present in the water, the time required for breakdown of phytoplankton changes from 10.7 days to a total of 160 days.

The rate of phytoplankton breakdown can be represented using this equation:

In this equation, G(t) is the amount of particulate organic carbon (POC) overall at a given time, t. G(0) is the concentration of POC before breakdown takes place. k is a rate constant in year-1, and t is time in years. For most POC of phytoplankton, the k is around 12.8 years-1, or about 28 days for nearly 96% of carbon to be broken down in these systems. Whereas for anoxic systems, POC breakdown takes 125 days, over four times longer. It takes approximately 1 mg of oxygen to break down 1 mg of POC in the environment, and therefore, hypoxia takes place quickly as oxygen is used up quickly to digest POC. About 9% of POC in phytoplankton can be broken down in a single day at 18 °C. Therefore it takes about eleven days to completely break down phytoplankton.

After POC is broken down, this particulate matter can be turned into other dissolved carbon, such as carbon dioxide, bicarbonate ions, and carbonate. As much as 30% of phytoplankton can be broken down into dissolved carbon. When this particulate organic carbon interacts with 350 nm ultraviolet light, dissolved inorganic carbon is formed, removing even more oxygen from the environment in the forms of carbon dioxide, bicarbonate ions, and carbonate. Dissolved inorganic carbon is made at a rate of 2.3–6.5 mg/(m3⋅day).

As phytoplankton breakdown, free phosphorus and nitrogen become available in the environment, which also fosters hypoxic conditions. As the breakdown of this phytoplankton takes place, the more phosphorus turns into phosphates, and nitrogens turn into nitrates. This depletes the oxygen even more so in the environment, further creating hypoxic zones in higher quantities. As more minerals such as phosphorus and nitrogen are displaced into these aquatic systems, the growth of phytoplankton greatly increases, and after their death, hypoxic zones are formed.

Solutions 

To combat hypoxia, it is essential to reduce the amount of land-derived nutrients reaching rivers in runoff. This can be done by improving sewage treatment and by reducing the amount of fertilizers leaching into the rivers. Alternately, this can be done by restoring natural environments along a river; marshes are particularly effective in reducing the amount of phosphorus and nitrogen (nutrients) in water. Other natural habitat-based solutions include restoration of shellfish populations, such as oysters. Oyster reefs remove nitrogen from the water column and filter out suspended solids, subsequently reducing the likelihood or extent of harmful algal blooms or anoxic conditions. Foundational work toward the idea of improving marine water quality through shellfish cultivation was conducted by Odd Lindahl et al., using mussels in Sweden. More involved than single-species shellfish cultivation, integrated multi-trophic aquaculture mimics natural marine ecosystems, relying on polyculture to improve marine water quality.

Technological solutions are also possible, such as that used in the redeveloped Salford Docks area of the Manchester Ship Canal in England, where years of runoff from sewers and roads had accumulated in the slow running waters. In 2001 a compressed air injection system was introduced, which raised the oxygen levels in the water by up to 300%. The resulting improvement in water quality led to an increase in the number of invertebrate species, such as freshwater shrimp, to more than 30. Spawning and growth rates of fish species such as roach and perch also increased to such an extent that they are now amongst the highest in England. For smaller-scale waters such as aquaculture ponds, pump aeration is standard.

In a very short time the oxygen saturation can drop to zero when offshore blowing winds drive surface water out and anoxic depth water rises up. At the same time a decline in temperature and a rise in salinity is observed (from the longterm ecological observatory in the seas at Kiel Fjord, Germany). New approaches of long-term monitoring of oxygen regime in the ocean observe online the behavior of fish and zooplankton, which changes drastically under reduced oxygen saturations (ecoSCOPE) and already at very low levels of water pollution.

See also
 Algal blooms
 Anoxic event
 Dead zone (ecology)
 Cyanobacterial bloom
 Denitrification
 Eutrophication
 Hypoxia in fish
 Oxygen minimum zone

References

Sources

External links 
 Hypoxia in the Gulf of Mexico
 Scientific Assessment of Hypoxia in U.S. Coastal Waters Council on Environmental Quality
 Dead zone in front of Atlantic City
 Hypoxia in Oregon Waters

Aquatic ecology
Chemical oceanography
Environmental science
Water quality indicators
Oxygen
Endocrine disruptors
Limnology